Bacchisa coronata is a species of beetle in the family Cerambycidae. It was described by Pascoe in 1866.

Subspecies
 Bacchisa coronata coronata Pascoe, 1866
 Bacchisa coronata philippinica Breuning, 1956

References

C
Beetles described in 1866